This is a list of breweries in Arizona.

 8-Bit Aleworks: Avondale
 1912 Brewing Company: Tucson
 Arizona Wilderness Brewing Company: Gilbert
 Barrio Brewing Company: Tucson
 Beast Brewing Company: Bisbee Closed 2016. 
 Beaver Street Brewery: Flagstaff
 Black Bridge Brewery: Kingman
 Black Horse Brewery: Show Low
 Button Brew House: Tucson AZ
 Copper City Brewing Company: Douglas (Closed)
 Copper Mine Brewing Company: Tucson
 Dark Sky Brewing Co.: Flagstaff
 Desert Eagle Brewing Company: Mesa
 Dubina Brewing Company (now Throne. Brewing): Glendale
 Electric Brewing: Bisbee
 Four Peaks Brewery: Scottsdale
 Four Peaks Brewing Company: Tempe
 Goldwater Brewing Company: Scottsdale
 Harbottle Brewing Company: Tucson
 Historic Brewing Company: Flagstaff
 Huss Brewing Company: Tempe, AZ
 Kitsune Brewing Company: Phoenix
 LazyG Brewhouse: Prescott, AZ
 Lumberyard Brewing Company: Flagstaff
 Mother Bunch Brewing (now closed), Phoenix
 Mother Road Brewing Company: Flagstaff
 North Mountain Brewing Company: Phoenix
 Old Bisbee Brewing Company: Bisbee
 Papago Brewing (now closed): Scottsdale
 Peoria Artisan Brewery: Peoria
 The Perch Pub & Brewery: Chandler
 The Phoenix Ale Brewery: Phoenix
 SanTan Brewing Company: Chandler
 Scottsdale Beer Company: Scottsdale
 Sleepy Dog Saloon and Brewery: Tempe
 Thunder Canyon Brewery: Tucson
 Tombstone Brewing Company: Tombstone
 Two Brothers Tap House and Brewery: Scottsdale
 Wanderlust Brewing Company: Flagstaff
 Wren House Brewing: Phoenix

See also 

 Beer in the United States
 List of breweries in the United States
 List of microbreweries

References

External links
 Arizona breweries directory at RateBeer
 Arizona Craft Brewers Guild (also called the Arizona Craft Beer Guild)
 Brewery Collectibles Club of America - Arizona brewery listings
 chooseazbrews list of breweries

Arizona
Breweries
Breweries